John Hastings (1778December 8, 1854) was a U.S. Representative from Ohio.

Born in the Kingdom of Ireland in 1778, Hastings engaged in agricultural pursuits, while studying law in Lisbon, Ohio. He was admitted to the bar and practiced in Mississippi.

He returned to Ohio and settled in Hanover Township, Columbiana County, Ohio, where once again, he engaged in agricultural pursuits.

Hastings was elected as a Democrat to the Twenty-sixth and Twenty-seventh Congresses (March 4, 1839 – March 4, 1843).

He died near Hanoverton, Ohio, December 8, 1854 and was interred in Grove Hill Cemetery.

Sources

1778 births
1854 deaths
People from Hanoverton, Ohio
Irish emigrants to the United States (before 1923)
Democratic Party members of the United States House of Representatives from Ohio